The Bharatiya Janata Party contested the 2014 Maharashtra Legislative Assembly election independently on 260 seats after it broke up its 25 year old alliance with the Shiv Sena.

Background 
The election was held on 15 October 2014 with all the parties contesting independently without alliance, The BJP and the Shivsena broke up after BJP disagreed upon Shivsena's proposal of 151 seats for Shivsena and 119 for BJP and 18 seats for Others. The Indian National Congress and the Nationalist Congress Party also ended their 15 year old alliance after the Indian National Congress disagreed over the NCP's proposal of 50-50 CM formula and more contesting seats to the NCP.

The Campaign 
The Bharatiya Janata Party started its campaign from Mahalakshmi Racecourse, Mumbai where Prime Minister Narendra Modi addressed a rally and targeted the incumbent INC-NCP state government on various issues like Unemployment, Energy Crisis, Farmers Suicide and Security etc.

The BJP addressed over 715 rallies across the state with 27 special appearances made by star campaigner Narendra Modi, Union Minister Nitin Gadkari addressed over 104 rallies in various parts of Maharashtra.

Every BJP Chief Minister was placed to campaign in Maharashtra, Furthermore BJP poll strategists divided Maharashtra into 50 clusters, each comprising over 5-10 seats lead by BJP leaders with proven skills. by this the BJP aimed to reach almost all corners of Maharashtra.

The BJP threw a blitzkrieg campaign, where leaders from National to local campaigned 24x7 to ensure Majority BJP Government in the state, Poll Vans with GPS were deployed across the state where Narendra Modi's and BJP's message for Development was reached to all the citizens of Maharashtra.

Social Alliance 
After ending the Alliance with the Shiv Sena, the BJP had the support of four small parties(RPI (Athawale), Rashtriya Samaj Paksha, Shiv Sangram, Swabhimani Shetkari Saghtana) which were in the Maha Yuti

through these four parties the BJP aimed to get the support of various groups such as Dalits, OBC, Farmers etc across the state.

Results 
The BJP became the largest party in the election by winning 122 seats out of 260 it contested, the Shiv Sena won 63 seats coming second, the Indian National Congress won 42 seats and the Nationalist Congress Party won 41 seats

References

2014
2014 in Maharashtra